Zhou Zhongge (born 15 February 1967) is a Chinese track and field coach and former high jumper. He was the gold medallist at the 1990 Asian Games and the 1998 Asian Games silver medallist. He was the winner at the Asian Athletics Championships in 1998.

A four-time national champion, he represented his country at the 1991 World Championships in Athletics and Asia at the 1998 IAAF World Cup. He went into coaching after retiring from competition and helped Zhang Shufeng to a continental medal.

Career
Born in Beijing, he went to school in Chaoyang District in the city and rose to become the national high school champion in the high jump in 1986. This gained him selection for the 1990 Asian Games, held in his hometown of Beijing, and he cleared  to take the gold medal, seeing off a challenge from both national rival Liu and Japan's Takahisa Yoshida. This win made it three straight victories for China in that event, as Zhu Jianhua had won the previous two editions.

Zhou made his debut at a global at the 1991 World Championships in Athletics, being one of two selections alongside Xu Yang. Both jumpers achieved  in the qualifying round and failed to progress. He did not compete at a high level for several years after 1991, with his one performance of note being a third-place finish at the 1993 Chinese Games, finishing behind Xu and Bi Hongyong.

His return to form came in the 1998 season. He regained his place as the continent's top jumper by winning the gold medal at the 1998 Asian Athletics Championships in July, getting the better of Lee Jin-Taek of South Korea and Malaysian Loo Kum Zee. In his last international outing that year, he placed fifth for Asia at the 1998 IAAF World Cup.

After 1998 his successes were limited to national level. He won two further national titles in 2000 and 2001 to bring his career total to four.

Following his retirement from high jumping, he went into high jump coaching. Among his first charges was Zhang Shufeng. Zhou's work with him over three years (focusing on explosive jumping power and lowering the tall athlete's centre of gravity at take-off) improved Zhang's jumping to the  mark. As a result, Zhang won a bronze medal at the 2005 Asian Athletics Championships and won twice at the National Games.

National titles
Chinese Athletics Championships
High jump: 1990, 1998, 2000, 2001

International competitions

See also
List of high jump national champions (men)

References

External links

Living people
1967 births
Athletes from Beijing
Chinese male high jumpers
Chinese athletics coaches
Asian Games gold medalists for China
Asian Games silver medalists for China
Asian Games medalists in athletics (track and field)
Athletes (track and field) at the 1990 Asian Games
Athletes (track and field) at the 1998 Asian Games
World Athletics Championships athletes for China
Medalists at the 1990 Asian Games
Medalists at the 1998 Asian Games
20th-century Chinese people